Aspidoscelis rodecki, also known commonly as Rodeck's whiptail, is a species of lizard in the family Teiidae. The species is endemic to Mexico.

Etymology
The specific name, rodecki, is in honor of American entomologist Hugo George Rodeck (1903–2005).

Geographic range
A. rodecki is found in the Mexican state of Quintana Roo.

Habitat
The natural habitat of A. rodecki is the marine intertidal zone.

Reproduction
A. rodecki is an all-female species. Reproduction is oviparous, by parthenogenesis.

References

Further reading
Manríquez-Morán, Norma L.; Méndez-de la Cruz, Fausto R. (2012). "Origin and clonal diversity of the parthenogenetic lizard Aspidoscelis rodecki (Squamata: Teiidae): chromosomal evidence". Phyllomedusa 11 (1): 29–36. (in English, with an abstract in Spanish).
McCoy, Clarence J., Jr.; Maslin, T. Paul (1962). "A Review of the Teiid Lizard Cnemidophorus cozumelus and the Recognition of a New Race, Cnemidophorus cozumelus rodecki ". Copeia 1962 (3): 620–627. (Cnemidophorus cozumelus rodecki, new subspecies).
Reeder, Tod W.; Cole, Charles J.; Dessauer, Herbert C. (2002). "Phylogenetic Relationships of Whiptail Lizards of the Genus Cnemidophorus (Squamata: Teiidae): A Test of Monophyly, Reevaluation of Karyotypic Evolution, and Review of Hybrid Origins". American Museum Novitates (3365): 1-61. (Aspidoscelis rodecki, new combination, p. 22).

rodecki
Reptiles described in 1962
Taxa named by Clarence John "Jack" McCoy
Taxa named by T. Paul Maslin
Reptiles of Mexico